A fyrk was a monetary unit used in Sweden in the 15th to 17th century, with a value of between 1/6 and 1/2 öre. The word is derived from Middle Low German vereken (vierichen) and ultimately from ver or vier, a monetary unit (from vier, "four"). After the monetary unit had been abolished, the word remained in use in the general sense of "small money", "pennies", "an insignificant sum"; and as a slang word for "money" in Finland Swedish, from where it is borrowed in Finnish slang (as ).

With the Swedish municipal reforms of 1862, the unit fyrk was re-used as a unit for counting voting rights in the municipal election. It was in use from 1863-1909. The  or "road fyrk", a unit for road tax, remained in use until 1937.

Up until 17th century fyrks were minted from silver; later the copper was used as the value of the coin suffered continuous inflation.

References

"Fyrk" in Svenska Akademiens Ordbok
"Fyrk" in Nordisk familjebok, vol 9 (1908)
Nationalencyklopedin, s.v. "Fyrk"

Economic history of Sweden
Modern obsolete currencies